Abdullahi Dikko Inde ,  (11 May 1960 – 18 February 2021) was a Nigerian government official who served as the Comptroller-General of Nigerian Customs Service from August 2009 to August 2015.

Life and career
Dikko was born on 11 May 1960 in Musawa town, a local government area of  Katsina State, Nigeria. He attended Government College, Kaduna in 1974 where he obtained the West African Senior School Certificate Examination in 1980. He later obtained a Bachelor of Science degree in economics and Master of Science degree in finance from the University of Dimitrov Apostle Tshenov, Svishtov, Bulgaria.

He joined the Nigerian Customs Service in 1988.

He served in various customs commands including Seme Border, Tincan Island Port, Apapa, Imo Command, Kaduna, Badagry Area Command, Investigation and Inspection Headquarters, Abuja  Badagry Area Command before he was appointed Controller-General of Nigerian Customs Service on 26 August 2009. His tenure as the comptroller General of Customs was described as exemplary, as he reportedly played a significant role in the transformation of the Nigerian Customs Service.

Death
Dikko died of an undisclosed illness at an Abuja hospital on February 18, 2021 from COVID-19.

Awards
He was a recipient of numerous awards, including:
Member of The Federal republic, MFR awarded by the president of Federal Republic of Nigeria
Officer of the Federal Republic, OFR awarded by the president of the Federal Republic of Nigeria
Best Anti Smuggling Command of the year (2007) awarded by the National Council of Managing Directors of Licensed Customs Agents
International Freight Forwards Association Award of the Highest CAC Revenue Collector of the year (2007).
Badagry Prime Award for Excellence (2007).
Maritime Watch Outstanding Service Award (2007)
Bold News Africa International Magazine's African Leadership Icon Merit Award (2008)
African Leaders of Integrity Merit Award (2008).
Africa Gold International Communications Award for Great African Patriotic Achievers (GAPAGA) (2008).
African Age International Leadership Gold Award for Excellence.
African Choice International News Magazine Award for Meritorious Award for Heroic Service, (2009).
Transparent Monitoring Action's Award for Transparent Administrator of year (2009).
Globalink International 2009 African International Role Model Leadership Gold Award for National Development.
Sir Abubakar Tafawa Balewa Inspirational Leadership and Good Governance Award, (2009).
Maritime Reporters Association of Nigeria's MARAN Award for the most outstanding Customs Administrator, (2009).
National Association of Government Approval Freight Forwarder's (NAGAFF) Peace Award (2009).

See also
 Nigerian Customs Service

References

External links
 Official website

1960 births
2021 deaths
Nigerian government officials
People from Katsina State
Officers of the Order of the Niger
Nigerian customs service officer
Nigerian customs service personnel
Deaths from the COVID-19 pandemic in Nigeria